Turki Parish is an administrative unit of Līvāni Municipality in the Latgale region of Latvia.

References 

 

Parishes of Latvia
Līvāni Municipality
Latgale